The Roman Catholic Diocese of Wamba is a diocese located in the city of Wamba  in the Ecclesiastical province of Kisangani in the Democratic Republic of the Congo. Apparently, during the tenure of Bishop Kataka Lucete, there were 18 parishes and 42 diocesan priests.

Location

It has a population of about 600,000 inhabitants.
Of these, an estimated 40,000 are pygmies.
The diocese is bisected by the Nepoko River. 
This river separates different groups of the Budu people of Wamba Territory, who speak different dialects on the western Ibambi side of the river and on the eastern Wamba side, although they consider themselves one people.

History
Key events in the history of the diocese:
 March 10, 1949: Established as Apostolic Vicariate of Wamba from the Apostolic Vicariate of Stanley Falls
 November 10, 1959: Promoted as Diocese of Wamba

Leadership

Ordinaries, in reverse chronological order
 Bishops of Wamba (Latin Rite), below
 Parishes : 18
 Diocesans priests :42
 Bishop Janvier Kataka Luvete (since 1996.11.08)
 Bishop Charles Kambale Mbogha, A.A. (1990.06.11 – 1995.12.06), appointed Bishop of Isiro-Niangara; future Archbishop
 Bishop Gustave Olombe Atelumbu Musilamu (1968.09.05 – 1990.06.11)
 Bishop Joseph-Pierre-Albert Wittebols, S.C.I. (1959.11.10 – 1964.11.26); see below
 Vicar Apostolic of Wamba (Latin Rite), below
 Bishop Joseph-Pierre-Albert Wittebols, S.C.I. (1949.03.10 – 1959.11.10); see above

See also
 Roman Catholicism in the Democratic Republic of the Congo

References

Roman Catholic dioceses in the Democratic Republic of the Congo
Christian organizations established in 1949
Roman Catholic dioceses and prelatures established in the 20th century
1949 establishments in the Belgian Congo
Roman Catholic Ecclesiastical Province of Kisangani